The golden-throated barbet (Psilopogon franklinii) is an Asian barbet native to Southeast Asia, where it inhabits foremost forests between  altitude. It is listed as Least Concern on the IUCN Red List because of its wide distribution and stable population.

Taxonomy 
Bucco franklinii was the scientific name proposed by Edward Blyth in 1842 who described a vivid green barbet with a golden throat collected in Darjeeling.
It was placed in the genus Megalaima proposed by George Robert Gray in 1842 who suggested to use this name instead of Bucco. In the 19th and 20th centuries, the following golden-throated barbet zoological specimens were described:
Megalaema ramsayi proposed by Arthur Viscount Walden in 1875 was a golden-throated barbet collected in the Karen Hills.
Cyanops franklinii auricularis proposed by Herbert C. Robinson and C. Boden Kloss in 1919 for a barbet collected at the Langbian Plateau in southern Vietnam.
Cyanops franklinii minor proposed by C. Boden Kloss and Frederick Nutter Chasen in 1926 for a specimen collected in Perak, Malaysia.
Cyanops franklinii trangensis proposed by Joseph Harvey Riley in 1934 for a barbet collected in Thailand.
Molecular phylogenetic research of barbets revealed that the birds in the genus Megalaima form a clade, which also includes the fire-tufted barbet, the only species placed in the genus Psilopogon at the time. Barbets formerly placed in this genus were therefore reclassified under the genus Psilopogon.
Two golden-throated barbet subspecies are recognised as of 2014:
P. f. franklinii occurs in the Himalayan foothills from central Nepal to northern Myanmar, Laos and southwestern China.
P. f. ramsayi occurs from central and eastern Myanmar to the Malay Peninsula.

Description 
The golden-throated barbet is vivid green above with paler yellowish-green plumage below, deep blue wings and verditer underneath the tail. Its bill is dusky black, and it is black around the eyes. Its forehead is crimson and its throat orange. Its legs are greenish.

Distribution and habitat

The golden-throated barbet is resident in Nepal, India, Bhutan, Myanmar, Thailand, Malaysia, Laos, Vietnam and mainland China. Its presence in Bangladesh is uncertain.

Behaviour and ecology 
The male's territorial call is a very loud pukwowk.

References

Grimmett, Inskipp and Inskipp. Birds of India 
Ripley, D. (1945). The Barbets. The Auk Vol 62

External links 

avibase.bsc-eoc.org
Birdlife International

golden-throated barbet
Birds of Nepal
Birds of Bhutan
Birds of Myanmar
Birds of Northeast India
Birds of Yunnan
Birds of Southeast Asia
golden-throated barbet
golden-throated barbet
Articles containing video clips